João Baptista Martins (3 September 1927 – 16 November 1993) was a Portuguese footballer who played as a striker.

Club career
Born in Sines, Setúbal District, Martins signed with Sporting CP at the age of 19 for 100 escudos, after leaving G.D. CUF as the works team did not find him an occupation as originally promised. In his 13-year tenure in Lisbon, he won seven Primeira Liga championships and the 1954 Taça de Portugal.

In the 1953–54 season, Martins scored 31 times in 23 matches for the champions. On 4 September 1955, he scored the first-ever goal in the history of the European Cup, opening a 3–3 home draw against FK Partizan at the Estádio Nacional.

Martins was deployed in every attacking position during his spell with Sporting. The scorer of 258 competitive goals, he was also used as a makeshift goalkeeper in a game against Clube Oriental de Lisboa.

International career
Martins won 11 caps for Portugal over four and a half years. His first came on 23 November 1952, in a 1–1 friendly with Austria.

Later life and death
Martins settled in France after retiring, and worked in a factory. He died in that country in November 1993 aged 66, due to heart failure.

See also
List of one-club men

References

External links

1927 births
1993 deaths
People from Sines
Sportspeople from Setúbal District
Portuguese footballers
Association football forwards
Primeira Liga players
G.D. Fabril players
Sporting CP footballers
Portugal international footballers
Outfield association footballers who played in goal